Samuli Tyyskä (born 23 March 1990 in Helsinki, Finland) is a Finnish figure skater. He is the two time Finnish junior national champion. He is the 2007 Nordic junior silver medalist and has competed on the Junior Grand Prix circuit.

Competitive highlights

External links

 

Finnish male single skaters
1990 births
Living people
Sportspeople from Helsinki
Competitors at the 2011 Winter Universiade